Continental Square is a  office complex located in Roissypôle on the grounds of Paris-Charles de Gaulle Airport, in Tremblay-en-France, France, developed by Seifert Architects. The buildings have underground walkways that link to restaurants and other facilities under pyramid roofs.

History
GA was the builder and owner of Continental Square. Seifert Architects was the architect of the approximately  complex, which was built with off-site manufactured elements.

In 1995, the space was 70% leased, and the owner reduced rent rates. In 1997, the center, then owned by GCI, was 80% occupied.

In 2009, Aéroports de Paris, the operator of CDG Airport, and GE Capital Real Estate France via the subsidiary Foncière Ariane SAS signed an agreement to form a partnership managing the complex. SAS Roissy Continental Square is the name of the partnership. The partnership was finalized in December 2009.

Tenants
ProLogis has offices in the Bâtiment Saturne. Air France operates the Vaccinations Center at Paris-Charles de Gaulle Airport in the Bâtiment Uranus. Servair, an Air France subsidiary, has its head office in Continental Square.

References

Office buildings in France
Buildings and structures in Seine-Saint-Denis
Charles de Gaulle Airport
Airline headquarters